Lovell is an unincorporated community in Wyandot County, in the U.S. state of Ohio.

History
Lovell had its start in the 1870s soon after the railroad was extended to that point. A post office was established at Lovell in 1877, and remained in operation until 1909. The community was named for its founder, Lovell B. Harris.

References

Unincorporated communities in Wyandot County, Ohio
Unincorporated communities in Ohio
1877 establishments in Ohio
Populated places established in 1877